Gateway International Bridge is one of three international bridges that cross the U.S.-Mexico border between the cities of Brownsville, Texas, and Matamoros, Tamaulipas. It is owned and operated by Cameron County.  Over the past century, it has developed the nickname of "The New Bridge" when the bridge was remodeled back in the 20th century. Despite the fact that the Veteran's International Bridge is newer than Gateway, it still retains its nickname.

This international bridge unites the Matamoros–Brownsville Metropolitan Area, which counts with a population of 1,136,995, making it the 4th largest metropolitan area in the Mexico-US border.

Location
Gateway is located in Downtown Brownsville and a block from the University of Texas at Brownsville.  It is the most used international bridge in the city for pedestrian crossings.  People on the US side wanting to go to Mexico can simply park their car on the US side, walk over to Mexico and have access to several tourist attractions in Matamoros.  People on the Mexican side are able to walk over to the United States and have access to hundreds of retail outlets in Downtown Brownsville.

Brownsville Urban System, Brownsville's Mass Transit system, has its central bus station located three blocks from Gateway.

Border crossing

The Brownsville Gateway Port of Entry opened in 1926 with the completion of the Gateway International Bridge. All truck traffic has been prohibited since 1999.

References

International bridges in Texas
International bridges in Tamaulipas
Buildings and structures in Brownsville, Texas
Transportation in Brownsville, Texas
Road bridges in Texas
Toll bridges in Texas
Toll bridges in Mexico